Mohamed Fadel Fahmy ( ; born April 27, 1974) is an Egyptian-born Canadian journalist, war correspondent and author. He has worked extensively in the Middle East, North Africa, for CNN, BBC and Al Jazeera English.

Fahmy covered the Iraq War in 2003 for the Los Angeles Times and entered Iraq on the first day of the war from Kuwait. Upon completion of his one-year mission, he authored his first book, Baghdad Bound. Most recently, he covered the Arab Spring.

In September 2013, Fahmy accepted a new post as the Al Jazeera English International Bureau Chief based in Egypt. On 29 December 2013, he and two fellow Al Jazeera English journalists, Peter Greste and Baher Mohamed, were arrested by Egyptian authorities. On 23 June 2014, Fahmy was found guilty by a Cairo Criminal Court and sentenced to seven years of incarceration at the Tora Prison, a maximum-security prison.

On 1 January 2015, the Egyptian Court of Appeals announced a retrial for Fahmy, Mohamed, and Greste. Release on bail was not allowed. Fahmy renounced his Egyptian citizenship on 3 February 2015. to benefit from a presidential executive order allowing the deportation of foreign prisoners. His colleague Peter Greste was deported to Australia.

On 12 February 2015, both Fahmy and Baher Mohamed were released on bail and referred to a six-month-long retrial. On 29 August 2015, Fahmy, Mohamed, and Greste each received three-year sentences from the retrial judge. Greste was sentenced in absentia.

On 23 September 2015, it was reported that Fahmy was pardoned by the Egyptian President Abdel Fattah al-Sisi. In a BBC HARDtalk interview shortly after his release, he criticized Al Jazeera English's decision to take the Egyptian government to court for cancelling its network license. He also confirmed that he is suing Al Jazeera English for "100 million dollars" for "damages." President al-Sisi restored his Egyptian citizenship on June 10, 2016.

Fahmy started his new job as an adjunct professor at the University of British Columbia upon winning his freedom and returning to Vancouver, Canada. He authored a book about his imprisonment in Egypt titled The Marriott Cell: An Epic Journey from Cairo's Scorpion prison to Freedom. The book was adapted into a screenplay written by Michael Bronner.

Early life and background

Fahmy was born in Egypt on April 27, 1974. He has reported extensively in the Middle East, North Africa and North-America for BBC, CNN, and Al Jazeera English.

He covered the Iraq War in 2003 for the Los Angeles Times and entered Iraq on the first day of the ground war. Upon completion of his one-year mission, he authored his first book, Baghdad Bound.

Fahmy spent the following two years reporting for Dubai Television, producing dozens of segments for a prime time television talk show focused on social issues in the Persian Gulf states of Kuwait, Saudi Arabia, Bahrain, Oman and the UAE.

In 2007 he completed a one-year mission as a protection delegate for the International Committee of the Red Cross in Lebanon, protecting the rights of political prisoners, refugees and the missing.

In 2011, he was honored with a Peabody Award along with the CNN team for the network's coverage of the Arab Spring. The following year he won the Tom Renner Investigative Reporting award for producing the CNN Freedom Project documentary series "Death in the Desert". For the first time, the series exposed the organized crime rings operating the illegal human trafficking of Sub-Saharan Africans to Israel through its Sinai border with Egypt.

Fahmy co-authored Egyptian Freedom Story. The book is a photo documentary of the January 25th revolution of 2011.

In September 2013, he accepted a new post as the Al Jazeera English Egypt Bureau Chief.

On December 29, 2013, Fahmy was arrested along with his colleagues Peter Greste and Baher Ghorab. The trio is accused of conspiring with a terrorist group and fabricating news to portray Egypt in a state of civil war.

Fahmy has suffered a permanent disability in his right arm, as he was forced to sleep on the floor in solitary confinement of a freezing, insect-infested cell in the terrorist wing for the first month of his detention, worsening an injury he had sustained before his arrest and mis-healing his bones.

Fahmy received the Canadian Commission World Press Freedom Award and a certificate from the UNESCO on World Press Freedom Day dated May 3, 2014, which coincided with his appearance in court. World Press Freedom Day on 3 May 2014 Fahmy received the Canadian Commission World Press Freedom Award and a certificate from the UNESCO on World Press Freedom Day dated May 3, 2014, which coincided with Fahmy's appearance in court. He was allowed out of the cage to explain the nature of journalism to the judge. He reminded judge Nagy Shehata that ; "the world is watching" and asked for bail. His request was overruled after the judge wished him and his colleagues a "Happy Press Freedom Day"

On June 23, 2014, Mohamed Fahmy was sentenced to seven years in a maximum-security prison. International news organisations called the trial a farce. US Secretary of State John Kerry was highly critical of the sentences of Fahmy and his co-workers, terming them "chilling and draconian" and noted he had spoken to Egyptian governmental officials including President Abdul Fattah al-Sisi. The Egyptian president the following day announced that he would not interfere with the judiciary.

Fahmy along with his Al Jazeera English colleagues were seen internationally as political prisoners.

Mohamed Fahmy and his colleagues were awarded the Royal Television Journalism Judges' Award announced in London in February 2015.

Fahmy draws strength from similar experiences of his father who was imprisoned and placed on a watch-list for his writing and critique of the Mubarak regime before the January 25th revolution.

Career

2011 Egyptian Revolution
Fahmy reported live from the scene of the Israeli Embassy attack in Cairo in September 2011 and saved an American PBS NewsHour crew and senior correspondent Margaret Warner from a mob attack while covering the embassy attack.

He authored "Egyptian Freedom Story" in 2011 which included 200 photos to document the January 25th Revolution.

A Peabody Award was granted to Fahmy in 2011 for his contribution to the CNN coverage of the Arab Spring.

Arab Spring
In his role with CNN, he reported extensively on the fall of Hosni Mubarak during the January 25th revolution and on the Syrian uprising. He traveled to Libya during the early days of the revolution in 2011 and reported on the hunt for dictator Gaddafi, the formation of a transitional government and the rise of extremism.

In 2012, he covered the elections that brought the Muslim Brotherhood to power in Egypt and was the first western journalist to interview Mohamed Al Zawahiri , the brother of the Al Qaeda leader upon his release from prison.

Journalism Awards
 Tom Renner Investigative Reporting Award in 2011 for producing Death in the Desert broadcast on the CNN Freedom Project program. The film was singled out from 450 entries after it highlighted the magnitude of the illegal human trafficking operations run by gangs in the Sinai who kidnap and torture Sub-Saharan Africans looking to immigrate to Israel through Sinai.
 Peabody Award for contribution to the CNN Coverage of the Arab Spring in 2011.
 Canadian Commission World Press Freedom Award and a certificate from the UNESCO on World Press Freedom Day in 2014.
 Royal Television Journalism Judges' Award announced in London in February 2015. 
 Australia's Voltaire award for free speech in 2015.  
 International Association of Press Clubs Freedom of Speech Award in 2015.
 Writers Union of Canada: Freedom to Read Award in 2016.
 British Columbia Civil Liberties Association's Liberty Awards for exceptional contributions to human rights and civil liberties in 2016.

Philanthropy

He registered and launched the Fahmy Foundation nongovernmental organisation based in Vancouver during his imprisonment to advocate for and financially support journalists, photographers, and prisoners of conscience imprisoned worldwide.

Fahmy Foundation partnered with Amnesty International in writing a Protection Charter presented to Prime Minister Justin Trudeau and the liberal government in Ottawa. The document entails 12 practical steps for the government to reform and strengthen its mechanisms to protect Canadian citizens, permanent residents, journalists, and individuals with close Canadian connections from serious human rights violations in other countries.

Al Jazeera English

On 5 May 2015 Mohamed Fahmy sued Al-Jazeera for $100 million Canadian dollars ($83m; £53m) in a British Columbia court. The punitive and remedial damages are demanded for alleged negligence and breach of contract. He accuses the network of "negligence" by misinforming him about its legal status and their safety in Egypt.

Egyptian trial

On January 29, 2014, it emerged that the Egyptian authorities were to charge 20 defendants in the case including Fahmy.

On 20 February 2014, Fahmy plead not guilty and described his prison conditions as "psychologically unbearable." Fahmy was denied bail and had his court case adjourned until 5 March 2014.

On 31 March 2014, he and co-defendants Peter Greste and Baher Mohammed made a request to a judge during a hearing to be released.

Fahmy received the Canadian Commission World Press Freedom Award and a certificate from UNESCO on World Press Freedom Day dated May 3, 2014, which coincided with his appearance in court. He was allowed out of the cage to explain the nature of journalism to the judge. He reminded judge Nagy Shehata that ; "the world is watching" and asked for bail. His request was overruled after the judge wished him and his colleagues a "Happy Press Freedom Day".

Fahmy addressed the court in an emotional plea on June 16 and once again denied the charges and said, " I wish there was a single shred of evidence so I could defend myself. And, even if there was, you would have to prove ill-intent".

On June 23, 2014, the Cairo Criminal Court convicted the three journalists. International news organisations called the trial a farce. US Secretary of State John Kerry was highly critical of the sentences of Fahmy and his co-workers, terming them "chilling and draconian" and noted he had spoken to Egyptian governmental officials including President Abdul Fattah al-Sisi. The Egyptian president, who later said that he wished the journalists had simply been deported, the following day announced that he would not interfere with the judiciary.  President al-Sisi said in a speech at the Military Academy graduation ceremony that he called Minister of Justice Mahfouz Saber and told him,

On 23 July 2014, the judge in the case released his reasoning for the sentence, saying the Al-Jazeera journalists were brought together "by the devil" to destabilize Egypt.

Telecommunication mogul and billionaire Naguib Sawiris alleged that Fahmy has no affiliation with the Muslim Brotherhood.  Sawiris even took his fury further and released a video calling on president Abdel Fattah al-Sisi to release Fahmy.

His lawyer Amal Clooney hired on his own capacity and not through Aljazeera Media Network called the judicial process a "show-trial" in her 18 August 2014 op-ed for the Huffington Post. She released several statements, including one on 24 November 2014 calling on the Egyptians to release her client, and urged the Qatari government and Al Jazeera to take positive steps to support his freedom and refrain from actions that hinder his cause.

On January 1, 2014, the highest court in Egypt upheld the sentence.

On 1 February, Fahmy's colleague Peter Greste was deported to Australia. The Egyptian law allowing the deportation of foreigners stipulates that they face prison or trial in their home country, but Australia is not likely to uphold Greste's conviction, no explanation was given for his release. However, Fahmy was released on bail after spending 411 days of incarceration. He was banned from leaving Egypt, as his retrial continued in the Cairo Criminal Court, and faced the possibility of returning to prison at the end of the retrial.

Retrial
The trio stood trial on 1 January 2015, before the Egyptian High Appellate court. The court ordered a retrial for Fahmy and his two colleagues, while keeping them in custody.  On 2 February 2015, it was reported that he would renounce his Egyptian Citizenship so he could fit the Foreign-Pardon law and be deported to his Canada, where he is a citizen. He renounced his Egyptian citizenship on 3 February 2015. On 12 February 2015 Fahmy was released on bail of 250,000 Egyptian Pounds. Baher Mohamed was also released. The presiding judge adjourned proceedings until 23 February.

On 29 August 2015, the Egyptian court sentenced Fahmy and Mohammad to three years in prison. They were found guilty of not registering with the country's Ministry of Culture, using central Cairo's Marriott hotel as a broadcasting point without permission, bringing into Egypt equipment without security officials' approval, and spreading false news. His legal team included Amal Clooney, who was able to secure on 30 August an interview with CBC Television's The National reporter in Egypt, Derek Stoffel, in which she called for Stephen Harper to intervene on behalf of Fahmy, saying

The ambassador in Egypt for the UK, John Casson, was disciplined by the Egyptian foreign ministry over his "unacceptable interference" in the affair, made in Arabic outside the court, on Facebook and on Twitter. The interference was deemed "incompatible with diplomatic norms and practices", and a spokesman "rejects any foreign criticism of judicial verdicts." Casson said the court's decision would "undermine confidence in Egypt's stability" although it was not immediately apparent why this should be the case. In the original trial, two al-Jazeera journalists from Britain, Sue Turton and Dominic Kane, had been tried and found guilty in absentia. Amal Clooney orchestrated another television interview for the benefit of British viewers. Clooney was to appear with the Canadian ambassador to Egypt, Troy Lulashnyk, to pressure Egyptian officials for a presidential pardon.

In the context of the 2015 Federal election in Canada, Justin Trudeau, the leader of the Liberal Party of Canada and Tom Mulcair, the leader of the New Democratic Party of Canada both tweeted their support of Fahmy and attacked Harper. Each of the opposition foreign affairs critics called for firm action: NDP Foreign Affairs Critic Paul Dewar said,

while Liberal Foreign Affairs Critic Marc Garneau stated that Harper should contact el-Sissi and

Pardon
A presidential spokesman for Sisi announced on 23 September 2015 that Fahmy and Baher Mohamed had been pardoned and were slated for release. Sisi issued the pardons ahead of the Eid al-Adha holiday and festival.

See also
Al Jazeera controversies and criticism

References

External links
Mohamed Fahmy's Twitter Account
Fahmy Foundation Website
Fahmy Foundation Twitter Account

Living people
Al Jazeera people
CNN people
Prisoners and detainees of Egypt
Journalists from Cairo
Canadian male journalists
Canadian male non-fiction writers
Egyptian emigrants to Canada
Peabody Award winners
City University of Seattle alumni
Canadian people imprisoned abroad
Imprisoned journalists
1974 births